A masala box (or அஞ்சறை பெட்டி, dabbe, or dabba) is a popular spice storage container widely used in Indian kitchens.

A typical masaladabbi has a number of small cups, often seven, placed inside a round or square box. The modern boxes have transparent lids and display the contents inside.  Usually a small spoon (approximately 1/2 teaspoon size) accompanies the box. The most popular and daily usage spices like mustard, chili, garam masala, cumin, fenugreek, variety of masalas, ajwain (bishop's weed) etc. are stored in this box.

Some antique masaladabbis are heirloom art objects, and are passed on in a family from generation to generation.

References

Indian spices
Food preparation utensils